Horace Allen Northcutt (February 16, 1883 – March 23, 1950) was an American politician. He was a member of the Arkansas House of Representatives, serving from 1933 to 1936 and from 1941 to 1946. He was a member of the Democratic party. Northcutt also served as a State Senator.

References

1950 deaths
1883 births
20th-century American politicians
Speakers of the Arkansas House of Representatives
Democratic Party members of the Arkansas House of Representatives